The Algeria A' national football team is the local national football team of Algeria and is open only to domestic league players. The team represents Algeria at the African Nations Championship and is controlled by the Algerian Football Federation.

The primary men's Algeria national football team contains expatriate players and represents Algeria at the Africa Cup of Nations.

African Nations Championship record

Coaching staff

Managerial history

 Chaib was in charge of a pair of friendlies against Mali since Benchikha was on duty with the A national team

Players

Current squad
 The following players were called up for the friendly match.
 Match dates: 7 January 2023
 Opposition:  Ghana
 Caps and goals correct as of:''' 4 January 2023

Recent call-ups
The following players have been called up to the Algeria squad at least once within the last 12 months.

Results and fixtures

2021

2022

2023

All-time record

References

External links
Algerian FA
DZFoot

A
Algeria